On August 16, 2000, in Kasler v. Lockyer, the Supreme Court of California ruled to uphold the Roberti-Roos Assault Weapons Control Act (AWCA) with additional expansions to the restrictions. Effective January 1st, 2001, all firearms listed on the Assault Weapons Control Act (AWCA), with the addition of more AR and AK-style weapons, were deemed illegal Assault Weapons and were required to be registered, deactivated, or turned in to the state.
 However, in 2021, a federal court struck down the law in Miller v. Bonta, which is pending appeal.

List of prohibited firearms
The following are the firearms that are restricted under the Kasler v. Lockyer Assault Weapon List:

Restricted AK-style firearms
1. American Arms
AK-Y 39
AK-F 39
AK-C 47
AK-F 47
2. Arsenal
SLR (All Variants)
SLG (All Variants)
3. B-West
AK-47 (All Variants)
4. Hesse Arms
Model 47 (All Variants)
Wieger STG 940 Rifle
5. Inter Ordnance - Monroe, NC
RPK
M-97
AK-47 (All Variants)
6. Kalashnikov USA
Hunter Rifle / Saiga
7. MAADI CO
AK 47
AKM
MISR (All Variants)
MISTR (All Variants)
8. Made In China
84S
AKM
86S
AKS
56
AK
56S
AK47
9. MARS
Pistol
10. Mitchell Arms, Inc
M-90
AK-47 (All Variants)
AK-47, 308 Caliber (All Variants)
M-76
RPK
11. Norinco
86S
86 (All Variants)
84 S
81 S (All Variants)
56
RPK Rifle
NHM 90, 90-2, 91 Sport
AK-47 (All Variants)
MAK 90
56 S
Hunter Rifle
12. Ohio Ordnance Works
ROMAK 991
AK-74
13. Poly Technologies
AKS
AK47
14. Valmet
Hunter Rifle
76 S
15. WUM
WUM (All Variants)

Restricted AR-style firearms
1. American Spirit
USA Model
2. Armalite
AR 10 (All Variants)
M15 (All Variants)
Golden Eagle
3. Bushmaster
XM15 (All Variants)
4. Colt
Law Enforcement (6920)
Match Target (All Variants)
AR-15 (All Variants)
Sporter (All Variants)
5. Dalphon
B.F.D.
6. DPMS
Panther (All Variants)
7. Eagle Arms
M15 (All Variants)
EA-15 A2 H-BAR
EA-15 E1
8. Frankford Arsenal
AR-15 (All Variants)
9. Hesse Arms
HAR 15A2 (All Variants)
10. Knights
SR-15 (All Variants)
SR-25 (All Variants)
RAS (All Variants)
11. Les Baer
Ultimate AR (All Variants)
12. Olympic Arms
AR-15
CAR-97
PCR (All Variants)
13. Ordnance, Inc
AR-15
14. Palmetto
SGA (All Variants)
15. Professional Ordnance, Inc.
Carbon 15 Rifle
Carbon 15 Pistol
16. PWA
All Models
17. Rock River Arms, Inc
Standard A-2
CAR A2
Standard A-4 Flattop
CAR A4 Flattop
NM A2 - DCM Legal
LE Tactical Carbine
18. Wilson Combat
AR-15

Firearms on both Kasler v. Lockyer and the AWCA
The following firearms were carried over from the AWCA.

AK-style firearms
1. MAADI CO
AK 47
AKM
2. Made In China
84S
AKM
86S
AKS
56
AK
56S
AK47
3. Norinco
86S
84 S
56
56 S
4. Poly Technologies
AKS
AK47

AR-style firearms
1. Colt
AR-15

References 

2000 in United States case law
Gun politics in the United States
United States firearms law